George H. Handley (5 July 1912 – 9 July 1943) was an English professional footballer who played as an inside forward in the Football League for Crystal Palace.

Football career
Handley began his football career in September 1931 with Hednesford Town. He soon came to the attention of West Bromwich Albion, for which he signed in June 1932. Despite playing many matches in the reserves and being capped at the amateur level for England, Handley never appeared for the first team at West Brom. Transferred to Crystal Palace in 1934, he played 5 matches in the Football League Third Division South before being signed by Brierley Hill Alliance the next season. Handley's next and final club was Darlaston, where he played until the outbreak of the Second World War in 1939.

Personal life
Handley was married. He served as a lance corporal in the 2nd (Airborne) Battalion of the South Staffordshire Regiment during the Second World War and was killed during the invasion of Sicily on 9 July 1943. Handley's body was never recovered, and he is commemorated on the Cassino Memorial.

Career statistics

References

1912 births
1943 deaths
Sportspeople from Wednesbury
Footballers from Staffordshire
Association football inside forwards
English footballers
English Football League players
Hednesford Town F.C. players
West Bromwich Albion F.C. players
Crystal Palace F.C. players
Brierley Hill Alliance F.C. players
Darlaston F.C. players
South Staffordshire Regiment soldiers
British Army personnel killed in World War II
Military personnel from Staffordshire
Allied invasion of Sicily